Malaysia national ice hockey team may refer to:
 Malaysia men's national ice hockey team
 Malaysia women's national ice hockey team